Holger Obermann (31 August 1936 – 30 October 2021) was a German former (semi-) professional football player and football manager, journalist and ARD television reporter. From 1971 to 1984, he was one of the moderators of the sports program.

Career
Obermann was born in Kassel. He first started playing for KSV Hessen Kassel. He continued his career at Concordia Hamburg and FSV Frankfurt. In 1961, he went to the United States, where he was the first German professional. He played in New York City at Elizabeth S.C. the 1st German-American Soccer League.

His journalist career began with an internship at the Hamburger Morgenpost. Later, he was an editor and foreign correspondent for the New Yorker Staats-Zeitung, head of a German radio station and staff of the American television ABC in Miami. After his return to Germany in 1966, he was a senior editor at TV the Hessischer Rundfunk, later head of the editorial Television Sports currently at South German Radio. Here he commented on football games for ARD.

Obermann was involved for many years in the sport-related development assistance in crisis areas. His work as a "sports development expert" led him on behalf of the German Football Association and the National Olympic Committees around 30 locations, including East Timor, Cameroon, Nepal, Bangladesh, Sri Lanka and Afghanistan. Several times he was honored for his commitment. In 1997, he was awarded the Federal Cross of Merit and 2004, the prize for tolerance and fair play of the Federal Ministry of the Interior, Building and Community.

Obermann was a senior adviser of the Afghanistan football project sponsored by FIFA. From January until March 2003, he led the Afghanistan national football team. From March 2004, he was an honorary member of the Afghan Football Association for his contributions to youth development. After the Indian Ocean tsunami of 2004, he was named by FIFA as technical consultant for the reconstruction program in Sri Lanka, where he worked directly on site.

Obermann helped to found the German American Society of Hollywood Florida in 1964.

Personal life and death
Obermann married to Barbara in 1961. They had two children. He died from COVID-19 in Friedrichsdorf on 30 October 2021, during the COVID-19 pandemic in Germany.

Writings

Awards
 1997 Officer's Cross of the Order of Merit of the Federal Republic of Germany
 2004 Clasp of Merit from the German Football Association (DFB)
 2004 Fair Play Prize
 2010 FIFA Order of Merit
 2013

References

1936 births
2021 deaths
Sportspeople from Kassel
German footballers
Association football goalkeepers
KSV Hessen Kassel players
SC Concordia von 1907 players
FSV Frankfurt players
Elizabeth S.C. players
German football managers
Afghanistan national football team managers
Officers Crosses of the Order of Merit of the Federal Republic of Germany
Footballers from Hesse
Deaths from the COVID-19 pandemic in Germany
German expatriate football managers
German expatriate sportspeople in Afghanistan